Givin' It Back is the ninth album released by The Isley Brothers on their T-Neck imprint on September 25, 1971. After years of having white rock acts covering their most famed material, particularly, "Shout" (1959) and "Twist and Shout" (1961), the Isleys decided to do the same to music made famous by white artists such as Stephen Stills, Eric Burdon and Neil Young. Among the songs they covered were "Spill the Wine", "Love the One You're With", the social commentary medley of "Ohio" and "Machine Gun" (from Jimi Hendrix), "Fire and Rain" by James Taylor and Bob Dylan's "Lay Lady Lay". The Isleys' perseverance paid off when their covers of "Love the One You're With", "Lay Lady Lay" and "Spill the Wine" became charted hits. Bill Withers plays guitar on the Isleys' version of his "Cold Bologna".

The album was remastered and expanded for inclusion in the 2015 released 23CD box set The RCA Victor & T-Neck Album Masters (1959-1983).

Reception

Track listing

Trivia 
The only other recording of "Cold Bologna" is found on the 1973 Bill Withers live album, Live at Carnegie Hall as "Harlem/Cold Baloney".

Personnel 
 Ronald Isley – lead and backing vocals
 O'Kelly Isley Jr. and Rudolph Isley – backing vocals
 Ernie Isley – lead guitar (1-5, 7), rhythm guitar, drums
 Marvin Isley – bass guitar
 Chris Jasper – piano 
 Chester Woodard – lead guitar (1-5, 7), rhythm guitar
 Bill Withers – lead guitar (6)
 Milton Westley – organ 
 John Mosley – flute
 George Moreland – drums, percussion
 Gary Jones – congas (1-6)
 Buck Clarke – congas (7)

Technical & arrangements
 Produced by Ronald Isley & Rudolph Isley
 Hal Wilson – photography
 George Patterson – musical arrangements 
 The Isley Brothers – musical arrangements

References

External links 
 The Isley Brothers - Givin It Back (1971) album to be listened as stream on Spotify

1971 albums
Buddah Records albums
The Isley Brothers albums
Albums produced by Ronald Isley
Albums produced by Rudolph Isley
T-Neck Records albums